Akropolis was a Greek newspaper based in Athens. Between 1883 and 1921, it played a major part in the debate concerning the Greek language question, particularly in the events leading up to the Gospel Riots of 1901 in Athens.

History 
Akropolis was essentially the creation of one man, Vlasis Gavriilidis, who founded it in 1883 and played a great part in running it until his death in 1920. Eight months later the newspaper ceased publication, although it was relaunched in 1929 and has been published intermittently since then.

References 

Greek-language newspapers
Defunct newspapers published in Greece
Newspapers published in Athens
Newspapers established in 1883
1883 establishments in Greece
Daily newspapers published in Greece